Rod Blagojevich (born December 10, 1956), often referred to by his nickname "Blago" is an American former politician, political commentator, and convicted felon who served as the 40th governor of Illinois from 2003 to 2009. He was impeached, removed from office, convicted, and incarcerated for eight years on federal charges of public corruption. A member of the Democratic Party, Blagojevich previously worked in both the state and federal legislatures. He served as an Illinois state representative from 1993 to 1997, and the U.S. representative from Illinois's 5th district from 1997 to 2003.

Born and raised in Chicago, Blagojevich graduated from Northwestern University in 1979 and the Pepperdine University School of Law in 1983. After graduating, he became a criminal prosecutor at the Cook County State's Attorney Office during the late 1980s. Turning to elective politics, he represented the 33rd state house district in the Illinois House of Representatives where he supported mostly law and order policies. Forgoing a third two-year term in the state legislature, he represented  for six years, winning re-election twice. He was elected Illinois governor in 2002, the first Democrat to win the office since 1972. There was increased public education funding, infrastructure development, and criminal justice reforms during his first term.

A 2006 re-election and his second term led to the passage of a variety of healthcare, gun control, and anti-discrimination bills. Starting in December 2008, a federal investigation and trial found Blagojevich guilty of public corruption after he attempted to sell the U.S. Senate seat vacated by Barack Obama upon his election to the presidency. Blagojevich was impeached, convicted, and removed from office in 2009 by the Illinois General Assembly. He was also subsequently barred by the Illinois Senate from holding public office within the state ever again. For his role in the corruption scandal, Blagojevich was sentenced to 14 years in federal prison. After an appeal for his release, U.S. President Donald Trump formally commuted his sentence in 2020, after Blagojevich had been imprisoned for nearly eight years; the executive order ended his sentence six years early. In May 2020, Blagojevich launched a politics-themed podcast called "The Lightning Rod" on WLS-AM 890.

Early life
Rod Blagojevich was born in Chicago, Illinois, the second of two children. His parents were Serbian immigrants from Yugoslavia. His father, Rade B. Blagojevich, was an immigrant steel plant laborer from a village near Kragujevac, Serbia. His mother, Mila, was a Bosnian Serb, whose family was originally from Gacko, Bosnia and Herzegovina. His parents moved to Chicago in 1947. Blagojevich has a brother, Rob, who worked as a fund-raiser for Blagojevich in his later political career. Blagojevich spent much of his childhood working odd jobs to help the family pay its bills. He was a shoeshiner and pizza delivery boy before working at a meat packing plant. In order to afford university costs, Blagojevich worked for the Trans-Alaska Pipeline System as a dishwasher.

Blagojevich does not have a middle name, but uses the initial "R" in honor of his deceased father. His nickname in the family was "Milorad," which some have mistakenly thought to be his name at birth.

Blagojevich graduated from Chicago's Foreman High School after transferring from Lane Technical High School. He played basketball in high school, and participated in two fights after training as a Golden Gloves boxer. After graduation, he enrolled at the University of Tampa. After two years, he transferred to Northwestern University in suburban Evanston, where he graduated in 1979 with a B.A. in history. He earned his J.D. from the Pepperdine University School of Law in 1983. He later said of the experience: "I went to law school at a place called Pepperdine in Malibu, California, overlooking the Pacific Ocean — a lot of surfing and movie stars and all the rest. I barely knew where that law library was." Blagojevich is married to Patricia Mell, the daughter of former Chicago alderman Richard Mell.

Blagojevich voted for Ronald Reagan in 1980 and voted for his re-election in 1984.

Amateur boxing career
Blagojevich had an amateur boxing career which spanned 13 months and included Golden Gloves competition. He trained under Jerry Marzillo in Chicago's Park District, and he fought some of his matches at the St. Andrews Gym in Chicago's Northside.

Early career

Prosecutor
Blagojevich clerked for Chicago Alderman Edward Vrdolyak. Blagojevich then took a job as Cook County Assistant State's Attorney (assistant prosecutor) under State's Attorney Richard M. Daley, specializing in domestic abuse crimes and felony weapons cases.

State and federal legislator
In 1992, with the backing of his influential father-in-law, Blagojevich unseated 14-year incumbent Myron Kulas in the Democratic primary for the 33rd state house district, in the Illinois House of Representatives, which includes part of Chicago's North Side. As is the case with most state legislative elections in Chicago, this virtually assured him of election in November. He drew on his experiences as a prosecutor to draft bills that he argued would strengthen the state's judicial system and reduce crime.

The district had long been represented by Dan Rostenkowski, who served as chairman of the House Ways and Means Committee. Rostenkowski lost reelection in 1994 to Republican Michael Patrick Flanagan after pleading guilty to mail fraud. However, Flanagan was a conservative Republican representing a heavily Democratic district and was regarded as a heavy underdog. Blagojevich soundly defeated Flanagan by a nearly 2-to-1 margin, with support from his father-in-law. He was elected two more times, taking 74% against a nominal Republican challenger in 1998 and having only a Libertarian opponent in 2000.

Blagojevich was not known as a particularly active congressman. In the late 1990s, he traveled with Jesse Jackson to Belgrade in the Federal Republic of Yugoslavia to negotiate with President Slobodan Milošević for the release of American prisoners of war.

On October 10, 2002, Blagojevich was one of 81 House Democrats, and one of only two from Illinois (the other being David D. Phelps), who voted in favor of authorizing the invasion of Iraq.

Gubernatorial campaigns

2002 election

During 2002, Blagojevich campaigned for his party's nomination to become governor. Blagojevich won a close primary campaign against former Illinois Attorney General Roland Burris and Chicago Public Schools Superintendent Paul Vallas, who ran well in the suburban collar counties of Chicago. Blagojevich finished strongly in Southern Illinois, winning 55% of the primary vote downstate, enough to win a primary victory by a thin margin.

During the primary, state Senator Barack Obama backed Burris but, at Burris's suggestion, supported Blagojevich after he won the primary, serving as a "top adviser" for the general election. Future Obama senior adviser David Axelrod had previously worked with Blagojevich on congressional campaigns, but did not consider Blagojevich ready to be governor and declined to work for him on this campaign. According to Rahm Emanuel, he, Obama, Blagojevich's campaign co-chair David Wilhelm, and another Blagojevich staffer "were the top strategists of Blagojevich's 2002 gubernatorial victory", meeting weekly to outline campaign strategies. However, Wilhelm has said that Emanuel overstated Obama's role in the sessions, and Emanuel said in December 2008 that Wilhelm was correct and he had been wrong in his earlier 2008 recollection to The New Yorker.

In the general election, Blagojevich defeated Republican Illinois Attorney General Jim Ryan. Blagojevich's campaign was helped by his well-connected father-in-law, Chicago alderman Richard Mell. Ethics scandals had plagued the previous administration of Republican George Ryan (no relation to Jim Ryan), and Blagojevich's campaign focused on the theme of "ending business as usual" in state government. Polls prior to the election found that many Illinois voters were confused about the names of George Ryan and Jim Ryan, a fact which Blagojevich used to his advantage. He asked, "How can you replace one Ryan with another Ryan and call that change? You want change? Elect a guy named Blagojevich." Blagojevich won with 52% of the vote over Jim Ryan. On election night, he said: "Tonight, ladies and gentlemen, Illinois has voted for change."

2006 reelection

 
From 2005 to 2006, Blagojevich served as federal liaison for the Democratic Governors Association. In 2005, Blagojevich also served as a Chair of the Midwestern Governors Association.

Numerous scandals brought the governor's approval rating as low as 36 percent, with 56 percent disapproving near the end of 2005.  By early 2006, five Republicans campaigned in the primary for the right to challenge him in the general election, with state treasurer Judy Baar Topinka eventually winning the nomination.

Blagojevich formally began his 2006 reelection campaign for Governor of Illinois on February 19, 2006. He won the Democratic primary on March 21 with 72% of the vote against challenger Edwin Eisendrath, whom Blagojevich would not debate.
He convinced Democratic state senator James Meeks not to launch a third-party campaign by promising to attempt to lease out the state lottery to provide education funding.

Blagojevich was endorsed by many Democratic leaders (with the notable exception of Attorney General Lisa Madigan, who claimed it was a conflict of interest since her office was investigating him), including then-Illinois Senator Barack Obama, who endorsed the governor in early 2005 and spoke on his behalf at the August 2006 Illinois State Fair. Blagojevich was also endorsed by the state's Sierra Club, the only Illinois governor ever endorsed by the organization. The union American Federation of State, County and Municipal Employees declined to endorse Blagojevich for reelection, citing the 500 jobs he eliminated from the Illinois Department of Natural Resources, which left some state parks unsupervised.

In 2004, Blagojevich had ordered the Illinois Tollway to erect 32 signs at a cost of $480,000, announcing "Open Road Tolling. Rod R. Blagojevich, Governor." In 2006, the signs were criticized for serving as campaign signs and costing significantly more than the common $200 signs.

In the general election, Blagojevich defeated Topinka and the Green Party's Rich Whitney, outspending Topinka $27 million to $6 million. He attempted to tie Topinka to former Republican governor George Ryan's corruption. Topinka ran advertisements detailing Blagojevich's federal investigations and non-endorsements by major state Democrats such as Lisa Madigan. A three-term state treasurer, Topinka said that she had attempted to stop Blagojevich from using money from special funds for general expenditures without approval of the legislature; she said Blagojevich used the funds for projects meant to distract voters from his associates' corruption trials: "This constant giving away of money ... a million here, a million there, it raids our already hamstrung government and deadbeat state." Topinka's spokesman claimed that Blagojevich was the most investigated governor in Illinois history. Topinka lost to Blagojevich by 11%.

Gubernatorial administration

After the 2002 elections, Democrats had control of the Illinois House, Senate, and all but one statewide office. While in office, Blagojevich signed progressive legislation such as ethics reform, death penalty reform, a state Earned Income Tax Credit, a statewide comprehensive smoking ban and expansions of health programs like KidCare and FamilyCare (FamilyCare was ruled unconstitutional). Blagojevich signed a bill in 2005 that prohibited discrimination based on sexual orientation in employment, housing, public accommodations, and credit. Blagojevich originally campaigned against pork barrel spending, but eventually used it himself to gain more votes for bills.

Soon after taking office in 2003, Blagojevich continued support of a moratorium on executions of death row inmates, even though no such executions are likely to occur for years (his predecessor, George Ryan, commuted all of the death sentences in the state shortly before leaving office in 2003). This support continued through his administration.

Another notable action of his term was a strict new ethics law. When campaigning for re-election in 2006, Blagojevich said that if his ethics law had existed when former governor George Ryan had been in office, Ryan's corruption might not have occurred. Blagojevich also signed a comprehensive death penalty reform bill that was written by then-Senator Barack Obama and the late U.S. Senator Paul M. Simon. Organized labor and African Americans were Blagojevich's staunchest political supporters. In 2008, he told a group of African-Americans that he sometimes considered himself the first African American governor of Illinois.

Education
Blagojevich oversaw record increases in funding for education every year without raising general sales or income taxes. He was criticized by Republicans and many moderate Democrats for using funds from the state pension system in order to fund other spending. Another early 2006 proposal included "PreSchool for All" for all three- and four-year-old children in Illinois. Legislation authorizing the program was adopted as part of the fiscal year 2007 budget.

Proposed capital programs
On January 10, 2006, Blagojevich announced a proposal for a new $3 billion (US) spending plan for Illinois roads, mass transit, and schools, to be paid for by increased tax revenue and new gambling proposals (such as Keno and lottery games). The proposal met with immediate opposition by members of the Republican Party of Illinois and many Democrats, who viewed it as "an election year ploy". The suggestion to legalize Keno within Illinois was later withdrawn. As of 2008, Blagojevich had been unable for five years to agree to a capital plan that would improve Illinois infrastructure.

In March 2008, Blagojevich announced a bipartisan coalition, chaired by former U.S. Speaker of the House Dennis Hastert and Former U.S. Congressman Glenn Poshard, to develop a capital construction plan that could pass the Illinois General Assembly. The Illinois Works Coalition toured the state and developed a compromise $34 billion package that relied on a lease of the Illinois Lottery, road funds, and expanded gambling for funding. The plan passed the Senate but stalled in the Illinois House, with opposition from Democrats.

Special sessions
Blagojevich called the Illinois General Assembly into special session 36 times while in office, which is half of the total number of special sessions called since 1970. The sessions were blamed for disrupting lawmakers' time off, while Blagojevich himself did not attend the sessions.

Relationships with lawmakers
Blagojevich disagreed with many state Democrats while in office, with House and Senate Republican leaders Frank Watson and Tom Cross often refereeing among the Democrats. During 2008, Blagojevich even expressed fear that House Democrats would gain more seats and he would face more opposition.

Blagojevich's lieutenant governor was Pat Quinn. Quinn and Blagojevich publicly disagreed over Blagojevich's proposed Gross Receipts Tax to increase revenue for schools and other projects within Illinois. Quinn said in December 2008, that he had last spoken to Blagojevich in the summer of 2007. Blagojevich also feuded with Attorney General Lisa Madigan, Comptroller Dan Hynes, Secretary of State Jesse White, and state treasurer Alexi Giannoulias — all of whom are Democrats.

Blagojevich was often at odds with members of both parties in the state legislature. Democratic legislator Jack Franks said that the reason Blagojevich had problems passing laws with the cooperation of the General Assembly is that he did not spend enough time with the legislature. "That's a real reason he has such poor relations with the Legislature and can't get any of his agenda passed, because he doesn't talk to anybody." When lawmakers working on a budget during a special session met at 10 am rather than 2 pm, and Blagojevich's attorney threatened that the Governor was considering legal action against the involved representatives, Democratic Rep. Joe Lyons told reporters, "We have a madman. The man is insane."

Although Barack Obama served as an adviser to Blagojevich's 2002 gubernatorial campaign, by all accounts, Blagojevich and Obama have been estranged for years. Blagojevich did not endorse Obama in the 2004 United States Senate race, and Obama did not invite Blagojevich to speak at the 2008 Democratic National Convention, as he did Lisa Madigan, Hynes, and Giannoulias. Blagojevich has had a "friendly rapport" with the man who took over his congressional seat, Rahm Emanuel.

Blagojevich has also disagreed publicly with then-Democratic Chicago Mayor Richard M. Daley; after their dispute over Chicago Transit Authority funding, Daley called Blagojevich "cuckoo" and said he did not want to argue with the Governor since "He's arguing with everybody in America." Blagojevich replied, "I don't think I'm cuckoo."

Soon after a meeting of 2007 with Democratic State Senator Mike Jacobs, meant to convince Jacobs to vote for Blagojevich's health insurance proposals, Jacobs emerged telling reporters that the Governor "blew up at him like a 10-year-old child", Blagojevich would not comment on the alleged incident. Jacobs said during 2008: "This is a governor who I don't think has a single ally, except for Senate president Emil Jones — and that's tenuous at best." Jones and Blagojevich sometimes collaborated, while at other times they disagreed on funding for education.

During a 2008 Congressional race pitting Democratic state senator Debbie Halvorson against Republican Marty Ozinga, the Democratic Congressional Campaign Committee ran television advertisements attempting to help Halvorson by linking Republican Ozinga to Blagojevich, asserting that Ozinga had given campaign donations to the Democratic governor.

The Daily Show appearances
During early February 2006, Blagojevich appeared on The Daily Show to discuss the governor’s executive order that pharmacists must dispense any drugs for which a customer had a valid prescription, including birth control pills and Plan B. This measure was being challenged on the show by state legislator Ron Stephens from Greenville, Illinois. Blagojevich was interviewed by Jason Jones, who repeatedly pretended to be unable to pronounce Blagojevich's name and simply called him "Governor Smith". At one point in the interview, Jones, who was acting as if he were against the governor's order, told him, "I'll be in charge of what my listeners hear." This prompted Blagojevich to turn to the camera and ask, "Is he teasing me or is that legit?" Two weeks after the interview, Blagojevich said that he was unaware of the nature of the show. Stephens said he knew beforehand that the show was a comedy show: "I thought the governor was hip enough that he would have known that, too."

Stephens later said, "With all due respect to the governor, he knew it was a comedy show. It's general knowledge for people under 90 years of age. It was when he came off looking so silly that he said he thought it was a regular news program. Even assuming he didn't know about it beforehand, we had to sign a release before the interview."

Blagojevich made another appearance on The Daily Show on August 23, 2010, after his removal from office. During his time on the show, he vehemently defended himself against host Jon Stewart's critique of things that he had previously said on the show. Stewart focused on how Blagojevich had expressed a great desire to tell his side in court, but then did not. Stewart attempted to get a promise that next time, Blagojevich would testify. Stewart also focused on Blagojevich's previous statement to him, that if one heard the famous "effing golden" statement in context, it would be seen as innocent. Stewart played the additional recording, and asked him how that sounded any different. The former governor had no concrete answers.

Political positions

State spending
Blagojevich was criticized for using what his opponents called "gimmicks" to balance the state budget. Republicans claimed that he was simply passing the state's fiscal problems on to future generations by borrowing his way to balanced budgets. Indeed, the 2005 state budget called for paying the bills by underfunding a state employees' pension fund by $1.2 billion.

During 2008, Blagojevich proposed issuing $16 billion in new bonds for the state to meet pension fund requirements. Blagojevich once told a gathering of black ministers on Chicago's South Side that he was "on the side of our Lord" with his budget proposals.

Blagojevich proposed a budget for 2008 with a 5% increase from the year before. Budget reductions of some programs caused Blagojevich to attempt to close 11 state parks and 13 state historic sites, with his spokesman saying Blagojevich had never visited any of them. To plug state budget holes, Blagojevich at one point proposed selling the James R. Thompson Center or mortgaging it. Blagojevich was also criticized for his handling of the 2007 state budget. In particular, critics cited his unprecedented use of line-item and reduction vetoes to remove his political opponents' "member initiatives" from the budget bill.

During 2003, more than 1,000 Illinois judges began a class action lawsuit against Blagojevich, because Blagojevich had stopped constitutionally-required cost of living pay increases for the judges due to budget reductions. The case was settled in the judges' favor in 2005, with Blagojevich's veto ruled as violating the state's constitution.

Health care

During a suspected shortage of the flu vaccine in 2004, Blagojevich ordered 260,000 doses from overseas distributors, which the Food and Drug Administration had warned would be barred from entering the United States. Although the vaccine doses had cost the state $2.6 million, the FDA refused to allow them into the country, and a buyer could not be found; they were donated to earthquake survivors in Pakistan a year later. However, the lots had expired, and Pakistan destroyed the vaccines.

Also in 2004, Blagojevich's plans to set up a website for Illinois residents to import medication from Canada and the United Kingdom was blocked by the U.S. Food and Drug Administration. Imported medication would have saved users of the service 25 to 50 percent over domestic drugs.

Blagojevich issued an executive order during 2004 requiring pharmacists in the state to dispense "morning-after" birth control, even if they object on moral or religious grounds. This order was legally challenged. Later in 2007, opponents of the governor's executive order reached a settlement with the state in one case, causing partial removal of the order. The settlement, which followed the Illinois Supreme Court's decision in September 2007 to hear an appeal of a lawsuit challenging the executive order, allowed pharmacists to decline to dispense birth control, so long as they provided information to customers about pharmacists who did. In another case, Morr-Fitz v. Blagojevich (later Morr-Fitz v. Quinn), the Illinois Court of Appeals ruled against Blagojevich's order.

During October 2005, Blagojevich announced All Kids, his plan to provide access to state-subsidized healthcare for every child in Illinois. Signed into law by Blagojevich in November 2005, All Kids made Illinois the first state in the U.S. to attempt to legally require itself to provide universal affordable and comprehensive healthcare for children, regardless of income and immigration status.

During March 2007, Blagojevich announced and campaigned for his universal healthcare plan, Illinois Covered. The plan was debated in the Illinois State Senate, but came one vote short of passing. He proposed to pay for the plan with the largest tax increase in Illinois history. He proposed a gross receipts tax on businesses, a $7.6 billion tax increase, with proceeds earmarked to provide universal healthcare in Illinois, increase education spending by $1.5 billion, fund a $25 billion capital construction plan, and reduce the State's $40 billion pension debt. Illinois House Speaker Michael Madigan called for a vote on a non-binding resolution on whether the state should impose a gross receipts tax. When it became apparent that the resolution would be defeated, Blagojevich announced at the last minute that supporters should vote against it, although the vote was intended to be a test vote to gauge whether the measure had any support. The request was seen by many lawmakers from both parties as an attempt to spin the loss positively. It was defeated by a vote of 107–0, which the Associated Press termed "jaw-dropping". When asked about the vote of the day, Blagojevich said, "Today, I think, was basically an up. ... I feel good about it."

Blagojevich also successfully proposed a new tax on businesses that do not provide health insurance to their employees.

Lawmakers did not approve another initiative of Blagojevich's, FamilyCare (which would provide healthcare for families of four making up to $82,000), but Blagojevich attempted to implement the plan unilaterally by executive order. In rejecting Blagojevich's executive order, a legislative committee questioned how the state would pay for the program. Blagojevich's decision has been called unconstitutional by two courts, which nullified the plan. However, during October 2008, pharmacies which had followed Blagojevich's directive to dispense drugs under the plan were informed by his administration that they would not be reimbursed and would have payments given under the system deducted from future Medicaid payments. One state lawmaker, Republican Ron Stephens, suggested that Blagojevich should pay the difference out of his own personal account. The Pantagraph agreed with Stephens in an editorial.

Associated Press attempted under the Freedom of Information Act to discover how the state planned to pay for the Blagojevich-ordered program, how many people were enrolled, or how much the care had cost the state but were refused the information by state departments.

Business
After Blagojevich pushed for a law banning sales of certain video games to minors, a federal judge declared the law violated the First Amendment, with the state ordered to pay $520,000 in legal fees.

Blagojevich vetoed three bills that would permit trucks to drive 65 mph outside the Chicago area instead of the current 55 mph, stating that one bill "compromises safety".

Blagojevich threatened to stop the state's dealings with Bank of America Corp. over a shut-down factory in Chicago. On December 8, 2008, all state agencies were ordered to stop conducting business with Bank of America to pressure the company to make the loans. Blagojevich said the biggest U.S. retail bank would not get any more state business unless it restored credit to Republic Windows and Doors, whose workers were staging a sit-in. John Douglas, a former general counsel for the FDIC and attorney for Bank of America, called Blagojevich's gambit dangerous.

Gun control
Blagojevich has been described as a "staunch" supporter of gun control.

During his February 2006 "State of the State" address, Blagojevich said the state should ban semi-automatic firearms.

As a state legislator, Blagojevich proposed raising the price of an Illinois Firearm Owners Identification (FOID) card from $5 to $500.
Blagojevich vetoed three gun bills in 2005, which would have:
 Deleted records in gun database after 90 days
 Eliminated the waiting period for someone wanting to buy a rifle or shotgun, when trading in a previously owned weapon
 Overridden local laws regulating transport of firearms.

Oprah Winfrey
In early 2009, Blagojevich reported being so impressed by Oprah Winfrey's influence on the election of Barack Obama that he considered offering Obama's vacant Senate seat to Winfrey. Blagojevich summarized his reasons for considering Winfrey on various talk shows:

Winfrey noted that although she was uninterested, she did feel she could be a senator.

Political analyst Chris Matthews praised Blagojevich's idea of making Winfrey a senator, suggesting that in one move it would diversify the Senate and raise its collective IQ. Elaborating further he said:

Lynn Sweet of the Chicago Sun Times agreed with Matthews, writing Winfrey would be "terrific" and an "enormously popular pick".

Personal style
Blagojevich was famed for his flamboyant dress style, such as his taste for Charvet ties. After the Justice Department complaint was made public, Blagojevich's hairstyle became the subject of discussion and jokes for national and local media personalities. Blagojevich insisted his aides always carry a hairbrush for him. He referred to it as "the football", alluding to the term nuclear football, which represents the bomb launch codes never to be out of reach of the president.

Impeachment, removal from office, trial

After Blagojevich threatened to stop the state's dealings with Bank of America Corp. over a shut-down factory in Chicago, under the direction of U.S. Attorney Patrick Fitzgerald, Governor Blagojevich was arrested at his home by federal agents on December 9, 2008, and charged with corruption. The Justice Department complaint alleged that the governor conspired to commit several "pay to play" schemes, including attempting "to obtain personal gain ... through the corrupt use" of his authority to fill the United States Senate seat vacated by Barack Obama following his election as president, claiming that in wiretapped recordings Blagojevich discussed his desire to get something in exchange for an appointment to the seat. After various outreach efforts, he appointed former state attorney general Roland Burris on New Year's Eve 2008. Burris was seated after some initial opposition in mid-January 2009. A trial was set for June 3, 2010, and U.S. Attorney Patrick Fitzgerald spoke out on the charges, characterizing Blagojevich's actions as trying to auction the open seat off to "the highest bidder".

The Illinois House and Senate moved quickly to impeach the governor for abuse of power and corruption. On January 8, the Illinois House voted 114–1 (with three abstentions) to impeach Blagojevich. The charges brought by the House emphasized Blagojevich's alleged abuses of power and his alleged attempts to sell legislative authorizations and/or vetoes, and gubernatorial appointments including that of Obama's vacated Senate seat. Blagojevich was taped by the FBI saying "I've got this thing, and it's fucking golden. I'm just not giving it up for fucking nothing."

On January 27, 2009, Blagojevich began a media campaign planned by publicist Glenn Selig. During the two-day campaign, he visited Today, Good Morning America, The Early Show, The View, multiple programs on Fox News Channel, CNN and MSNBC where he proclaimed his innocence and insisted he would be vindicated.

On January 29, 2009, Blagojevich was removed from office and prohibited from ever holding public office in the state of Illinois again, by two separate and unanimous votes of 59–0 by the Illinois Senate. His lieutenant governor Patrick Quinn subsequently became governor of Illinois. 

Blagojevich's impeachment trial and removal from office did not affect his federal indictment in the United States District Court for the Northern District of Illinois, since impeachment is a political as opposed to a criminal sanction in addition to being (in this particular case) a punishment imposed at the state level.

Post-removal activities
After being convicted and removed from office by the Illinois Senate, Blagojevich went on Late Show with David Letterman and The Daily Show with Jon Stewart, where he re-affirmed his innocence and stated that the Illinois legislature's decision to remove him from office was politically motivated, being due to his unwillingness to raise taxes. He has accused his successor, Pat Quinn, of using state funds excessively for personal leisure. A report later released by the Governor's office showed that most of Quinn's transportation fees were paid for by Quinn himself and that Quinn never accepted the $32 meal allowance from the State.

Blagojevich attempted to make a deal to star in NBC's 2009 summer reality show I'm a Celebrity ... Get Me out of Here! He made a request with the judge to ease his travel restrictions so that he could travel to Costa Rica to star in the show, saying that his family needed to make money. However, his request was formally rejected by U.S. District Judge James B. Zagel, who was sympathetic to Blagojevich's financial situation, but nevertheless stated, "I don't think this defendant fully understands and I don't think he could understand ... the position he finds himself in." Judge Zagel went on further to note that Blagojevich must prepare for his defense. 

Despite the ruling, NBC expressed an interest in negotiating with the judge to have Blagojevich as a part of the show. His wife took his place on the show, which began airing June 1, 2009. He told an interviewer he found it difficult to watch his wife eat a dead tarantula on the broadcast, but remarked that her willingness to participate in the show was "an act of love" because she was earning funds to alleviate their adverse financial position.

On June 13, 2009, Blagojevich starred in the improv group The Second City's musical Rod Blagojevich Superstar. He performed in order to support the charity Gilda's Club Chicago, which offers support for people living with cancer.

On June 30, 2009, Blagojevich's autobiography The Governor: The Truth Behind the Political Scandal That Continues to Rock the Nation was announced for print release on September 8, 2009. The book was also released by Amazon.com for sale as an eBook on the Kindle on the same day as the announcement.

On July 19, 2009, Blagojevich began hosting a two-hour weekly radio talk show on 890 WLS, which aired mid-day Sundays. He had previously been a guest host of the "Don Wade and Roma Morning Show" on WLS in March 2009. On June 2, 2010, WLS placed Blagojevich's radio show on hiatus while his corruption trial was ongoing.

Blagojevich appeared on season 9 of The Celebrity Apprentice in Spring 2010, asserting that he has the "skill and know-how to get things accomplished" on the series. Series star and producer Donald Trump praised Blagojevich's "tremendous courage and guts", and predicted that he would become one of the show's breakout stars. Trump subsequently fired Blagojevich in the fourth episode of the season, which aired April 4, 2010.

In an interview with Esquire in January 2010, Blagojevich said about President Obama, "Everything he's saying's on the teleprompter. I'm blacker than Barack Obama. I shined shoes. I grew up in a five-room apartment. My father had a little laundromat in a black community not far from where he lived. I saw it all growing up." He soon backpedaled from the term "blacker than", saying that he had chosen his words poorly, but he stood by his message that "the frustration is real, and the frustration is still, today, average, ordinary people aren't getting a fair shake."

Blagojevich made an appearance at the Wizard World Chicago comic convention in August 2010, conversing with and taking pictures with attendees. He charged $50 for an autograph and $80 for a photo. He also had a humorous televised meeting with Adam West; Blagojevich remarked that he considered The Joker to be the best Batman foil. Comic fandom website Bleeding Cool reported that Blagojevich had met with a mostly positive reception, while Time Out Chicago described it as mixed.

Federal trial and conviction

Blagojevich was indicted by a federal grand jury in April 2009. Most of the charges were related to attempts to sell the Senate seat vacated by then-President-elect Barack Obama. On August 17, 2010, he was convicted on one of the 24 federal charges, a charge of lying to the FBI, and the jury was hung on 23 other counts. The defense did not call a single witness, claiming that prosecutors did not prove their case. Because the jury could not agree on the remaining charges, a mistrial was ordered for those counts. Within 15 minutes after the mistrial was declared, the prosecution team announced that they would definitely pursue a retrial on the 23 mistrial counts. A post-verdict court date was set for August 23, 2010. Federal prosecutors reduced the number of counts for Blagojevich's retrial, and, on June 27, 2011, he was found guilty of 17 of the 20 remaining charges, not guilty on one, and no verdict was rendered by the jury on two counts. He was found guilty on all charges pertaining to the Senate seat, as well as extortion relating to state funds being directed towards a children's hospital and race track. However, he was acquitted on a charge pertaining to the tollway extortion and avoided a guilty verdict (by split decision) on attempting to extort Rahm Emanuel.

He reported to prison on March 15, 2012, at Federal Correctional Institution, Englewood, Colorado. His Federal Bureau of Prisons (BOP) number was 40892–424. Had his sentence not been commuted by President Donald Trump, under federal rules, Blagojevich would have served at least 85%, or 12 years, of his sentence after which time he may have been eligible for early release in March 2024, based on good behavior. However, President Trump commuted his sentence so he was released on February 18, 2020.

While in the federal penitentiary, Blagojevich was the lead singer for prison band called "The Jailhouse Rockers," named after an Elvis Presley song. The band dissolved when the lead guitarist was released.

He was the fourth Illinois governor to serve time in federal prison, after Otto Kerner Jr., Dan Walker, and George Ryan.

Appeal
Blagojevich appealed his conviction, claiming judicial bias and a tainted jury pool. He has also long contended that there was critical evidence the jury never heard, including witness testimony and recorded phone calls that Judge Zagel did not allow to be played during the trial. They have also argued that Blagojevich's own testimony was restricted by Judge Zagel's rulings.

In July 2013, Blagojevich filed an appeal with the United States Court of Appeals for the Seventh Circuit in Chicago challenging the corruption conviction and the length of his prison term. A three-judge panel of the Seventh Circuit heard arguments in the case in December 2013. In July 2015, the court unanimously vacated five of the corruption convictions, including his convictions for attempting to sell Barack Obama's vacant U.S. Senate seat after he was elected president, but affirmed the rest. The court's decision remanded to the district court. The Seventh Circuit denied Blagojevich's request for rehearing en banc, and in March 2016, the Supreme Court of the United States denied Blagojevich's petition for a writ of certiorari.

In August 2016, a resentencing hearing was held in the district court. Judge Zagel re-imposed the same 14-year sentence he had imposed in 2011. Zagel acknowledged the suffering of Blagojevich's family and Blagojevich's good conduct in prison, but found that Blagojevich's corrupt conduct still warranted a 14-year sentence. Blagojevich's attorneys appealed to the 7th Circuit, but failed; then filed another appeal with the U.S. Supreme Court on November 3, 2017. Meanwhile, unrepentant, Blagojevich continued to fight his conviction and sentence in the media. His wife Patti joined him in attracting press attention to his cause and criticism of the federal judiciary. On April 16, 2018, the U.S. Supreme Court refused to hear an appeal, the second time in two years.

Commutation
President Donald Trump, hours after having pardoned commentator Dinesh D'Souza, told reporters on May 31, 2018, that he was considering commuting Blagojevich's sentence (without pardoning him), as well as pardoning Martha Stewart. Trump called Blagojevich's sentence "unfair", saying that Blagojevich's statements about enriching himself were "stupid", but also the sort of thing "that many other politicians say". Blagojevich filed a petition officially asking President Trump for commutation of sentence on June 5, 2018. In August 2019, Trump commented to reporters that he was "very strongly" considering issuing a commutation.

On February 18, 2020, President Trump commuted Blagojevich's 14-year corruption sentence, wiping away the sentence but not the conviction. "I don't know him very well, I've met him a couple of times, he was on for a short time on The Apprentice years ago, seemed like a very nice person, don't know him, but he served eight years in jail, there's a long time to go," Trump said to reporters. Some news sources noted that, in addition to The Apprentice connection, Trump and his organization had made contributions to Blagojevich's political campaigns, including his 2002 gubernatorial campaign.

Blagojevich was released from prison that day, and flew home to Chicago that night. Speaking to reporters after his release, he stated, "I’m profoundly grateful to President Trump, and I will be for as long as I live." He said Trump was "a man who’s not only tough and outspoken, strong, but he has a kind heart", and proclaimed himself to be a "Trump-ocrat". On February 19, Blagojevich held a press conference at his home in Chicago's Ravenswood neighborhood, where he remained defiant towards his conviction, describing himself as a "political prisoner," and promised to use his experience in prison to fix the broken criminal justice system.

Illinois House GOP leader Jim Durkin criticized the President's decision to commute Blagojevich's sentence, stating that Blagojevich was "rogue on steroids" when he "abused the office" and that Trump was "not concerned about the people of Illinois in November." The commutation was satirized by Chicago-based The Wieners Circle. Following the commutation, the Illinois Attorney Registration and Disciplinary Commission found that Blagojevich had engaged in "a pattern of dishonest and deceptive conduct" and recommended his disbarment to the Illinois Supreme Court. On May 18, 2020, the Supreme Court of Illinois officially disbarred him.

In August of the same year, it was announced that Blagojevich would be the featured speaker at a fundraising event to benefit Republican state senate candidate Tom McCullagh. The candidate's campaign stated that "McCullagh is welcoming [Blagojevich] to the table to give us an inside look to help understand the depths of the Madigan machine and how to end corruption in Illinois."

Post-political career 
In May 2020, Blagojevich launched a politics-themed podcast titled "The Lightning Rod" on WLS-AM 890. The podcast ran through September 2021.

Electoral history

House of Representatives

1996
 Rod Blagojevich, Democratic: 64%
 Michael Flanagan (inc.), Republican: 36%

1998
 Rod Blagojevich (inc.), Democratic: 74%
 Alan Spitz, Republican: 24%

2000
 Rod Blagojevich (inc.), Democratic: 87%
 Matt Beauchamp, Libertarian: 13%

Gubernatorial elections
2002 gubernatorial election, Illinois
 Rod Blagojevich, Democratic: 1,818,823, 52.0%
 Jim Ryan, Republican: 1,582,604, 45.2%
 Cal Skinner, Libertarian: 73,404, 2.1%
 Marisellis Brown, Independent: 22,803, 0.7%

2006 gubernatorial election, Illinois
 Rod Blagojevich (inc.), Democratic: 1,736,219, 49.8%
 Judy Baar Topinka: Republican: 1,368,682, 39.3%
 Rich Whitney, Green: 361,163, 10.4%
 Randy Stufflebeam (Write-in), Constitution: 19,020, 0.5%
 Other Write-ins: 1,587, 0.0%

References

External links

 
 Indictment U.S. v. Blagojevich, et al. FindLaw
 Illinois Gov. Rod R. Blagojevich and his Chief of Staff John Harris Arrested on Federal Corruption Charges Department of Justice, December 9, 2008, press release
 United States District Court: United States of America v. Rod R. Blagojevich and John Harris, December 9, 2008, copy of 76-page complaint (text version)
 People of the State of Illinois v. Rod Blagojevich, Governor of Illinois brief, Motion for TRO, Supporting Record TRO
 Gov. Blagojevich Chicago Sun-Times, ongoing coverage
 Complete Blagojevich Coverage Chicago Tribune, ongoing coverage
 United States of America v. Rod Blagojevich, Alonzo Monk, John Harris and Robert Blagojevich Second Superseding Indictment, United States of America v. Rod Blagojevich, Alonzo Monk, John Harris and Robert Blagojevich
 

|-

|-

|-

|-

 
1956 births
Living people
Politicians from Chicago
Boxers from Illinois
Criminals from Chicago
Writers from Chicago
Democratic Party governors of Illinois
American gun control activists
American people of Serbian descent
American politicians convicted of fraud
American prisoners and detainees
American prosecutors
Eastern Orthodox Christians from the United States
Democratic Party members of the United States House of Representatives from Illinois
Disbarred American lawyers
Illinois lawyers
Illinois politicians convicted of crimes
Impeached state and territorial governors of the United States removed from office
Democratic Party members of the Illinois House of Representatives
People convicted of making false statements
Illinois politicians convicted of corruption
Politicians convicted of extortion under color of official right
Politicians convicted of mail and wire fraud
Recipients of American presidential clemency
The Apprentice (franchise) contestants
Participants in American reality television series
Northwestern University alumni
Pepperdine University School of Law alumni
20th-century American politicians
21st-century American politicians
21st-century American criminals